Sheikh Nasrallah Shah-Abadi , (24 September 1930 – 12 March 2018) was an Iranian Ayatollah. He represented the people of Tehran Province in the Fifth term of the Assembly of Experts.

Early life and education 
Nasrallah was born on 24 September 1930 in Qom to a religious family. His father, Mohammd Ali Shah-Abadi was a Grand Ayatollah (Marja').  

Nasrallah attended Tawfiq Elementary School in Tehran for his primary education, then in 1941 he pursued his Religious education in Tehran. While in Tehran he was taught by several people, such as Mirza Mahdi Ashtiani and others. After the death of his father in 1949, he left Tehran for Qom to pursue his Islamic Studies in Qom Seminary. While in Qom he was taught by many big scholars such as Hossein Borujerdi, Mohammad Ali Araki, and others. Eventually, in 1952, he went to Najaf to attend the Hawza Najaf for advanced Islamic Studies (Darse Kharej). While there, he gained Ijtihad when he was around 30, and mastered several subjects such as Fiqh (Islamic Jurisprudence), Islamic philosophy, Tafsir (Interpretation of Quran), and others. He benefited from several big scholars in Najaf such as Abu al-Qasim al-Khoei, Muhsin al-Hakim and others. He was there when Ruhollah Khomeini arrived, and with his brother Ruhollah Shah-Abadi, they attended his classes in Najaf.

Teachers 
Here is a list of some of the teachers of Nasrallah Shah-Abadi.

 Mirza Mahdi Ashtiani
 Mirza Abolhassan Sha'rani
 Haj Agha Mostafa Masjid Jamei
 Seyed Sadr al-Din Razavi Qomi
 Seyed Mohammad Ali Lavasani
 Sheikh Hassan Zahir al-Dini
 Sheikh Hossein Kani
 Seyed Hassan Ahmadi Alunabadi
 Mirza Abolfazl Najmabadi
 Mirza Hedayatullah Vahid Golpayegani
 Sheikh Abbas Abbas Tehrani
 Seyed Mohammad Kazem Assar
 Hossein Borujerdi
 Seyyed Mohammad Hojjat Kooh Kamari
 Seyed Mohammad Taqi Khonsari
 Sheikh Abbas Ali Shahroudi
 Seyed Ali Beheshti
 Seyed Abu al-Qasim al-Khoei
 Seyed Muhsin al-Hakim
 Sheikh Hossein al-Hilli
 Seyed Abd al-Hadi al-Shirazi
 Seyed Ruhollah Khomeini

Life after education 

In 1970, with the request of Abu al-Qasim al-Khoei, he travelled to Pakistan to help establish teaching seminaries and work with the Shia in Pakistan. However, after only spending several months there, he had gotten Malaria and went to Iran to receive treatment. After receiving treatment in Iran, he was put on a travel-ban by the Pahlavi regime and was not allowed to travel back to Pakistan, nor back to Najaf. While in Iran, he would spend his time in Tehran and Qom offering prayers and teaching in seminaries. Leading up to the 1979 Iranian Revolution, he was active and protested against the Shah. After the revolution, he remained dedicated to teaching Islam, as well as actively engaging in charity work around Iran.

He was voted by the people of Tehran Province in the 2016 Iranian Assembly of Experts election to represent them in the Assembly of Experts. He held that position until his death.

Death 

On 16 February 2018 Nasrallah was admitted to Baghiyyatollah al-Azam Military Hospital due to diabetic ulcers, as well as clogged arteries in his legs which led to respiratory arrest. He died on 12 March 2018 while in hospital. He was buried in Fatima Masumeh Shrine in Qom; his funeral prayers were led by Mousa Shubairi Zanjani. Ali Khamenei also sent a letter of condolence on his passing to his family.

See also 

 List of members in the Fifth Term of the Council of Experts
 2016 Iranian Assembly of Experts election in Tehran Province
 List of Ayatollahs
 Reza Ostadi
 Abbas Ali Akhtari
 List of provincial representatives appointed by Supreme Leader of Iran

References 

1930 births
2018 deaths
Members of the Assembly of Experts
People from Mazandaran Province
Iranian ayatollahs